Patrick Galbraith (born March 11, 1986) is a Danish professional ice hockey goaltender. Gailbraith currently plays under contract with SønderjyskE in the Danish Metal Ligaen (DEN).

Playing career
Galbraith spent the 2006-07 campaign with EJHL outfit New Hampshire Junior Monarchs. In his native Denmark, he played for Vojens IK.

Earlier in his career, he spent time with Swedish sides IK Oskarshamn, Frölunda HC, Leksands IF and IF Björklöven, had a short stint with HC Slovan Bratislava in Slovakia and was a member of the Espoo Blues in Finland. Galbraith played for Karlskrona HK in the HockeyAllsvenskan since 2013 before moving to Krefeld in December 2015,

After his first full season with the Pinguines in 2016–17, he appeared in 45 games but was unable to prevent the team from finishing last. Galbraith left the club on March 3, 2017, after it was revealed he would not be offered a new contract.

International play
Galbraith participated at the 2010 IIHF World Championship as a member of the Denmark men's national ice hockey team.

Personal
Patrick's father, George Galbraith, was also an ice hockey goaltender. A Canadian, George moved to Denmark in 1977 to play for Vojens IK.

References

External links

1986 births
Living people
IF Björklöven players
Danish ice hockey goaltenders
Danish people of Canadian descent
Espoo Blues players
Frölunda HC players
Karlskrona HK players
Krefeld Pinguine players
Leksands IF players
IK Oskarshamn players
Nottingham Panthers players
People from Haderslev Municipality
HC Slovan Bratislava players
SønderjyskE Ishockey players
Sportspeople from the Region of Southern Denmark
Danish expatriate sportspeople in Canada
Danish expatriate sportspeople in Finland
Danish expatriate sportspeople in Sweden
Danish expatriate sportspeople in the United States
Danish expatriate sportspeople in Slovakia
Danish expatriate sportspeople in Germany
Danish expatriate sportspeople in England
Expatriate ice hockey players in Canada
Expatriate ice hockey players in Finland
Expatriate ice hockey players in Sweden
Expatriate ice hockey players in the United States
Expatriate ice hockey players in Slovakia
Expatriate ice hockey players in Germany
Expatriate ice hockey players in England
Danish expatriate ice hockey people